Laurel Winter (born Laurel Anne Hjelvik in Columbus, Montana; April 22) is an author of fantasy, science fiction, and poetry. In childhood, she attended a one-room schoolhouse.

Her first published fantasy story was "Mail Order Eyes" in 1988. She has since won two Rhysling Awards.  Her novella "Sky Eyes", published in the March 1999 F&SF, won the World Fantasy Award in 2000.  She has  written young adult fiction. Her novel Growing Wings was first published in 2000 by Houghton Mifflin.

Bibliography

Novels

Short fiction 

Stories

References

External links 
Laurel Winter's official site

World Fantasy Award-winning writers
American writers of young adult literature
Writers from Montana
1959 births
Living people
People from Columbus, Montana
Rhysling Award for Best Long Poem winners
Rhysling Award for Best Short Poem winners
American women novelists
American women short story writers
Women writers of young adult literature
American science fiction writers
Women science fiction and fantasy writers
20th-century American novelists
20th-century American short story writers
20th-century American poets
20th-century American women writers
The Magazine of Fantasy & Science Fiction people
21st-century American women